Sir Noel Stanley Bayliss  (19 December 1906 – 17 February 1996) was an Australian chemist and professor of chemistry at the University of Western Australia. He was a Rhodes Scholar and graduated as dux of the academically renowned Melbourne High School. He then attended the University of Melbourne before going to Lincoln College, Oxford. The mineral baylissite K2Mg(CO3)2•4(H2O) is named for him.

References

1906 births
1996 deaths
People educated at Melbourne High School
University of Melbourne alumni
Academic staff of the University of Western Australia
Alumni of Lincoln College, Oxford
Australian Rhodes Scholars
Australian Knights Bachelor
Commanders of the Order of the British Empire
Fellows of the Australian Academy of Science
20th-century Australian scientists
Australian chemists